Turtle Island is a book of poems and essays written by Gary Snyder and published by New Directions in 1974.  Within it, Snyder expresses his vision for humans to live in harmony with the earth and all its creatures. The book was awarded the Pulitzer Prize for Poetry in 1975. "Turtle Island" is a name for the continent of North America used by many Native American tribes.

Background 
By the late 1950s, Gary Snyder had established himself as one of the major American poets of his generation. He was associated with both the Beat Generation and the regional San Francisco Renaissance. He spent much of the 1960s traveling between California and Japan, where he studied Zen. In 1966, he met Masa Uehara while in Osaka. They married the following year and had their first child, Kai, in April 1968; by December, Snyder and his new family moved to California. His return coincided with the highest crest of 1960s counterculture, as well as the nascent environmental movement. He was received as an elder statesman by both the hippies and the environmentalists, and he became a public intellectual who gave public lectures, making television appearances, and publishing new writing.

Many of the poems and essays in the book had been previously published. The essay "Four Changes" first appeared in The Environmental Handbook, a collection published by David Brower and Friends of the Earth for the first Earth Day in 1970. "Four Changes" was initially published anonymously with no copyright notice, and consequently it was widely reproduced. One of the poems, "The Hudsonian Curlew", was first published in the November 1969 issue of Poetry magazine. Some of the poems were published in 1972 as a limited-edition collection titled Manzanita.

Like Snyder's poetry of the late 1960s, many of the poems found in Turtle Island are political in nature. However, with American military involvement in the Vietnam War coming to a close, Snyder's attention had turned from matters of war and peace to environmental and ecological concerns. In 1973 several of Snyder's friends, interested in his new direction, gathered in Berkeley, California to hear him read his new work. At the reading, Snyder asked whether these political poems could "succeed as poetry"; his friends "reportedly refused to pass judgment" on the question. Later, the poet's UC Davis colleague Jack Hicks related words from a female graduate student who took one of Snyder's classes in the late 1980s: "there are two kinds of political poetry: Suckers—rare—seduce you to the point. Whackers assault you with the message.... I cited Turtle Island as a blatant whacker, and Gary defended it strongly. But first he listened."

Contents 
Turtle Island is split into four sections. The first three—Manzanita, Magpie's Song, and For the Children—include a total of almost 60 poems, while the fourth section, Plain Talk, includes five prose essays. The collection includes many of Snyder's most commonly quoted and anthologized poems. There is also an introduction, in which Snyder explains the significance of the book's title.

Reception 
For Poetry magazine, the critic Richard Howard reviewed Turtle Island alongside new collections by Marvin Bell and David Wagoner. According to Howard, the book describes "where we are and where he wants us to be," although the difference between those two is "so vast that the largely good-humored resonance of the poems attests to Snyder's forbearance, his enforced detachment." He praised the book's poems for their meditative quality and their lack of preachiness or invective. He described the poems as "transitory, elliptical, extraterritorial" works, in which "the world becomes largely a matter of contours and traces to be guessed at, marveled over, left alone."

In Library Journal, James McKenzie wrote:

Writing for the Christian Science Monitor, Victor Howes praised the book's "gentle, uncomplicated love-lyrics to planet earth" and said it would be equally appealing to poetry readers and to conservationists. Herbert Leibowitz, writing for the New York Times Book Review, was less enthusiastic. While Leibowitz found merit in a select few poems and praised Snyder's prose as "vigorous and persuasive", he found the collection "flat, humorless ... uneventful ... [and] oddly egotistical". In his view, it was "a textbook example of the limits of Imagism." Still, the critic said he was "reluctant to mention these doubts" because he found Snyder's fundamental environmentalist message to be so laudatory, even "on the side of the gods."

The first American edition was limited to 2,000 copies. As of 2005, the book had been reprinted roughly once a year in the United States, placing it among a handful of Snyder's books that have never gone out-of-print. It has sold more than 100,000 copies. The book has been translated into Swedish (by Reidar Ekner in 1974), French (by Brice Matthieussent in 1977), Japanese (by Nanao Sakaki in 1978), and German (by Ronald Steckel in 1980).

Pulitzer Prize 
Snyder received the Pulitzer Prize for Poetry for Turtle Island in May 1975. Because of Snyder's remoteness at Kitkitdizze, news of the award took some time to reach him. It was the first time a Pulitzer had been given to a poet from the West Coast. The prestigious award helped to legitimize Snyder's idiosyncratic worldview in the intellectual mainstream.

Along with the award itself, Snyder received a check for $1,000. According to his friend Steve Sanfield, Snyder quietly donated the money to a local volunteer organization that was building a new school in the San Juan Ridge area. The volunteers told Snyder that they would probably spend the money on beer, Sanfield said, and "though none of us knew where those beers came from at the time, they sure did taste good." Snyder maintained that the best perk of winning the Pulitzer Prize was that people no longer introduced him as "a Beat poet".

Citations

References

Bibliography

Journal and web articles

External links 
 Turtle Island at the Internet Archive; a digital copy of the book can be borrowed for 14 days with registration
 

Several poems from Turtle Island have been published online by the Poetry Foundation:
 "The Bath"
 "The Hudsonian Curlew"
 "I Went into the Maverick Bar"

1974 poetry books
1974 non-fiction books
1974 in the environment
American poetry collections
American essay collections
Books about California
Books about environmentalism
Books about North America
Deep ecology
Ecology books
English-language books
Environmental non-fiction books
Essays about poetry
Pulitzer Prize for Poetry-winning works
Simple living
New Directions Publishing books